Christine Lang (born December 23, 1957 in Bochum, West Germany,) is a German microbiologist and entrepreneur.

Life and work 

Lang was raised in Bochum, West Germany, with her brother Joachim Lang. She studied biology from 1976 to 1981 at the Ruhr-Universität Bochum and the University of Sussex. In 1985 she obtained a Dr. rer. nat. in Biology in Bochum on the molecular genetics of fungi, with her thesis entitled "Extrachromosomal in vitro genetics in fungi: chondriome vectors in yeasts."  She then worked in industrial research at the Hüls Chemie research center (now Marl Chemical Plant). In 1993 she moved to the Technical University of Berlin and habilitated in the field of microbiology and molecular genetics under the supervision of Ulf Stahl. At the TU Berlin she is an adjunct professor of microbiology and molecular genetics and teaches genetics in biotechnology.

In 2001 Lang and Ulf Stahl founded Organobalance GmbH, a company specializing in microbial strain development, which has been part of the Danish Novozymes A / S since September 2016. In 2010, together with Bernd Wegener, she founded Organobalance Medical AG, now Belano Medical AG. As of July 1, 2018, Lang gave up her long-term position as Managing Director of Organobalance Novozymes Berlin.

Awards and honors (selection) 
 Darboven IDEE Award (2nd place), 2003
 Berlin Entrepreneur of the Year (2nd place), 2008
 Journal of Dental Research Cover of the Year Award (1st place for innovative work and best photo), 2011
 Nomination for the Innovation Prize of the German Economy, 2016

Memberships 
Lang is involved in various associations: in the German Society of Chemical Engineering and Biotechnology e. V. and in the German Industry Association Biotechnology (a trade association in the Association of the Chemical Industry), where she is a member of the board.

Since 2012, Christine Lang, together with the agricultural economist Joachim von Braun, chaired the Bioeconomy Council of the German Federal Government, which advises the German government on the further development of the bioeconomy in Germany. Since March 2017 she is 1st Vice President of the Association for General and Applied Microbiology.

Works (selection) 
In addition to specialist publications, Christine Lang has also published books as an author and co-author.

References

External links 
 Prof. Dr. Christine Lang, Chair of the Bioeconomy Council

1957 births
German microbiologists
Living people